Grimm's Hollow is a 2019 role-playing video game developed by Mahum Najam under the alias "Ghosthunter". It was released as freeware on Steam and Itch.io on Halloween for Microsoft Windows, running on RPG Maker 2003.

Gameplay 
The player controls a singular player character, Lavender, as she navigates through the Hollow (the game's central town) and ghost caverns. Like most of RPG Maker games, maps are two-dimensional and in a top-down perspective. At the Hollow, the player can interact with the townsfolk, purchase food items that replenish the player's health at the Bakery, and progress the main plot. The player collects experience points (called Spirit Energy) by fighting ghosts, and these points can be used as currency to purchase food or progress their skill tree. Combat takes place in ghost caverns, where an encounter will start if the player interacts with a moving ghost.

There are four endings depending on its gameplay, whether or not she beats the final battle, and whether or not she reached her maximum level.

Plot 
The story starts with Lavender, a young girl who awakens in a bed in the afterlife. Surrounding her are balloons and skull-masked figures in purple robes. Their leader, a non-human entity called Grimm, informs her that she has died and reincarnated as a Reaper in the game's town, the Hollow. The dead in this world can reincarnate as ghosts, or Reapers; a type of psychopomp who defeats ghosts. Lavender does not believe Grimm's story, and starts to think of escape as soon as he leaves. However, a ghost appears and tells her that her brother, Timmy, has arrived with her into the Hollow. The game begins with Lavender embarking on a journey to find her missing brother and return home.

Development 
Grimm's Hollow was conceived on June 2018, described as "inspired by a longing for a short and sweet RPG experience". The game was using the RPG Maker 2003 engine as a primary game engine. Krita uses for the backgrounds and Microsoft Paint also uses for the characters, tilesets, and battle designs.

Release 
Grimm's Hollow was scheduled to release on October 31, 2019. Its downloadable content as Pocket Goods, which the booklet contains illustrations and concept arts, was released on June 1, 2021.

Reception 
The game received positive reviews and currently holds one of the Top 10 spot in the 150 best Steam games of all time tagged with RPG Maker.

References

Further reading

External links 
Official website

2019 video games
2010s horror video games
Horror video games
RPG Maker games
Windows games
Windows-only freeware games
Adventure games
Indie video games
Art games
Video games featuring female protagonists
Single-player video games
Role-playing video games